The Nkawkaw constituency is in the Eastern region of Ghana. The current member of Parliament for the constituency is Hon Kwakye Daffour. He was elected on the ticket of the New Patriotic Party in the 2012 General election to win the constituency election to become the MP. He succeeded Seth Adjei Baah who had represented the constituency in the 4th Republican parliament on the ticket as an Independent candidate.

See also
List of Ghana Parliament constituencies

References

Parliamentary constituencies in the Eastern Region (Ghana)